The relict splitfin (Xenoophorus captivus) is a species of splitfin endemic to the Pánuco River system in Mexico. It feeds on algae. It is found in the aquarium trade. It is the only known member of its genus.

References

Xenoophorus
Goodeinae
Freshwater fish of Mexico
Endemic fish of Mexico
Pánuco River
Natural history of San Luis Potosí
Natural history of Tamaulipas
Natural history of Veracruz
Endangered fish
Endangered biota of Mexico
Endangered fauna of North America
Fish described in 1924
Taxa named by Carl Leavitt Hubbs
Taxonomy articles created by Polbot